Belait Sixth Form Centre (PTEB), is a co-educational sixth form school located in Mumong, Kuala Belait, Brunei. The current principal is Mrs. Chin Ai Fong.

History
Construction of the campus was immediately put to a halt in 2014, after two separate accidents took place at the same construction site of the same project. The first accident claimed the life an Indonesian worker, while the second accident injured 9 other workers. On October 31, 2017, the school began applying fireproof materials to the building.

Prior to the opening of the school on November 16, 2020, students carried out higher educations in the Sayyidina Ali Secondary School (SMSA). Amidst the 2nd wave of COVID-19 pandemic in Brunei in late 2021, the building was converted into a quarantine area with its designation as COVID-19 Holding Area Belait 6th Form. Therefore, educations were carried out virtually and later in the SMSA building once again.

Sixth Form subjects
The school offers curriculum for the Cambridge 'A' and 'AS' levels, namely:
Mathematics
Physics
Chemistry
Biology
Accounting
Economics
Business
Sociology
History
Geography
Literature in English
Computer Science
Information Technology
English
Art and Design
Bahasa Melayu
Syariah
Usuluddin
Psychology

General Paper is a compulsory AS Level subject for all Sixth Form students, for which a credit 6 in BGCE "O" English Language is necessary. Sixth form students without a credit 6 in that subject usually sit again for it in June or November of their lower sixth year to enable them to undertake the GP course beginning in upper sixth.

References

External links 
 PTE Belait - Official Instagram

See also 
 List of schools in Brunei

Sixth form colleges in Brunei
Educational institutions established in 2020
2020 establishments in Brunei